George Innes  (1717–1781) was an Anglican clergyman who served in the Scottish Episcopal Church as the Bishop of Brechin from 1778 to 1781.

He was consecrated the Bishop of the Diocese of Brechin on 13 August 1778 at Edinburgh by Primus Falconer and bishops Rose and Petrie.

He died in office on 18 May 1781, aged 61.

References 

 
 

1717 births
1781 deaths
Bishops of Brechin (Episcopalian)
18th-century Scottish Episcopalian bishops